Francisco José Villalba Rodrigo (born 11 May 1998) is a Spanish footballer who plays as a midfielder for Segunda División club Málaga CF, on loan from Sporting de Gijón.

He began his career with Valencia and spent a season on loan to Numancia before coming to England in 2019 to join Birmingham City. He returned to Spain in January 2020 and spent the next 18 months on loan to Almería, before joining Sporting Gijón on loan for the 2021–22 season. In international football, he has represented Spain from under-16 to under-19 level.

Club career

Valencia
Born in the neighbourhood of El Cabanyal, Valencia, Villalba was a Valencia CF youth graduate. On 1 August 2014, after being linked to Liverpool, he signed a new four-year deal with Los Che.

On 1 February 2015, aged only 16, Villalba made his senior debut with Valencia's reserve team, coming on as a second-half substitute in a 1–2 away loss against CD Olímpic de Xàtiva in the Segunda División B championship. He appeared in two further matches during the campaign, both from the bench.

On 26 June 2015 Villalba was called up to the main squad by manager Nuno Espírito Santo for the pre-season. He made his professional debut on 16 December, as a half-time substitute for André Gomes in a 2–0 Copa del Rey home win against Barakaldo. Villalba made his La Liga debut on 31 December 2015, coming on in the 84th minute of a 1–0 away loss against Villarreal.

On 12 July 2018 he joined Segunda División club Numancia on a season-long loan. Villalba scored his first professional goal on 16 September 2018, the equaliser in a 1–1 draw away to Sporting de Gijón, and later in the match was sent off for the first time ever.

Birmingham City
On 7 August 2019, Villalba signed a three-year contract with Birmingham City of the English Championship. He made his debut three days later in the starting eleven for a 1–1 draw with Bristol City, came close to scoring from distance, and was the Birmingham Mail man of the match. Although he did not readily adapt to the quicker, more physical style of the English game, he was part of the starting eleven for the first four months of the season, apart from a spell out with a groin injury. He scored his first goal in a young Birmingham team that beat Middlesbrough 2–1 on 6 Octoberanother shot was "somehow kept out ... at point blank range"but according to the Mail, "what earned him his 76th-minute standing ovation was the tireless pressing and harrying that characterised his second period." However, with considerable competition in attacking midfield from Dan Crowley and new arrival Jérémie Bela as well as the emergence of the 16-year-old Jude Bellingham, Villalba dropped down the pecking order and out of the matchday squad. The last of his 17 appearances came in a 3–0 defeat away to Hull City on 21 December.

Villalba's contract was extended for a further year in January 2020, and he joined Almería on 27 January 2020 on loan to the end of the 2019–20 Segunda División season; the deal included an option to purchase. He scored once from five first-team appearances before football in Spain was suspended because of the COVID-19 pandemic, and once from four matches after the resumption, before his loan spell was extended to cover the remainder of the season. He finished with 18 appearances as Almería failed to secure automatic promotion and then lost to Girona in the play-off semi-final.

Villalba's loan was extended to the end of the 2020–21 season in a deal that retained the option to purchase. He made 30 league appearances as Almería again reached the play-offs and again lost to Girona in the semi-final, and the club chose not to retain his services.

He joined another Segunda División club, Sporting Gijón, on 3 August 2021 on loan for the 2021–22 season. His first goal, from a shot that looped up off a defender and over the goalkeeper, opened the scoring in a 2–1 defeat of Leganés on 10 September that extended Sporting's unbeaten start to the season to five matches. By the end of January 2022, he had 28 appearances, mainly as a starter, four goals and four assists, and the club confirmed that it had taken up its option to purchase. Villalba signed a four-year contract to come into force on 1 July, after the expiry of his loan.

Sporting Gijon
On 24 June 2022, Villalba's transfer to Sporting Gijón was finally confirmed, for an undisclosed fee. On 16 August, however, he moved to Segunda División rivals Málaga on loan for the season.

Career statistics

References

External links

1998 births
Living people
Footballers from Valencia (city)
Spanish footballers
Association football midfielders
La Liga players
Segunda División players
Segunda División B players
Valencia CF Mestalla footballers
Valencia CF players
CD Numancia players
UD Almería players
Sporting de Gijón players
Málaga CF players
English Football League players
Birmingham City F.C. players
Spain youth international footballers
Spanish expatriate footballers
Spanish expatriate sportspeople in England
Expatriate footballers in England